New Party may refer to:

 New Party (Corrientes), Argentina
 Civic Front of Córdoba, formerly known as New Party against Corruption, for Honesty and Transparence
 New Party (Brazil)
 New Party (Canada)
 New Party (Cyprus)
 New Party (Greece, 1873)
 New Party (Greece, 1947)
 New Party Japan
 New Party (Latvia), a defunct political party in Latvia
 New Party (Serbia)
 New Party (Taiwan)
 New Party (Turkey), founded in 2008
 New Party (Turkey, 1993)
 New Party (UK) - the party of Oswald Mosley
 The New Party (UK, 2003) - the party founded by Robert Durward in 2003
 New Party (United States)
 New Party Sakigake
 Japan New Party